William G. Witt (born February 2, 1950) is an American politician in the state of Iowa.

Biography
Witt was born in Elkader, Iowa and attended University of Northern Iowa. A Democrat, he served in the Iowa House of Representatives from 1993 to 2003 (23rd district). Witt specialized in the policy areas of long-term care of the elderly and persons with disabilities and natural resource conservation and environmental protection. He led an eight-year-long, ultimately successful, campaign to reform Iowa's Medicaid reimbursement system for long-term care facilities.

Writing and photographing under the byline "Bill Witt", he published numerous freelance magazine articles, as well as two books from the University of Iowa Press: Enchanted by Prairie (2009) and A Field Guide to Iowa's Native Orchids (2006). He won International Regional Magazine Awards (IRMA) for feature writing (1997) and photography (2000).

References

1950 births
Living people
People from Clayton County, Iowa
University of Northern Iowa alumni
Democratic Party members of the Iowa House of Representatives